Nélio dos Santos Pereira (born 8 December 1943) is a Brazilian former footballer. He played one season with the Baltimore Bays of the National Professional Soccer League.

References

1943 births
Living people
Association football forwards
Brazilian footballers
Footballers at the 1964 Summer Olympics
Olympic footballers of Brazil
Fluminense FC players
National Professional Soccer League (1967) players
Baltimore Bays players